Agnieszka Skalniak-Sójka (née Skalniak; born 22 April 1997) is a Polish racing cyclist, who currently rides for Polish amateur team MAT ATOM Deweloper Wrocław.

Major results

2014
2nd Road Race, National Junior Road Championships
3rd Road Race, UCI Junior World Championships

2015
1st  Time Trial, UEC European Junior Continental Championships
1st  Road Race, National Junior Road Championships
UCI Junior World Championships
3rd Road Race
9th Time Trial
10th Piccolo Trofeo Alfredo Binda

2016
9th Road Race, National Road Championships

2017
National Road Championships
3rd Time Trial
10th Road Race
6th Time Trial, UEC European U23 Continental Championships

2018
1st Stage 2 Tour de Feminin-O cenu Českého Švýcarska
National Road Championships
5th Time Trial
7th Road Race
9th Dwars door de Westhoek
European U23 UEC Continental Championships
10th Road Race
10th Time Trial

2019
National Road Championships
2nd Road Race
2nd U23 Time Trial
4th Time Trial
8th Time Trial, European U23 UEC Continental Championships
8th Team Time Trial, Postnord UCI WWT Vårgårda WestSweden
9th Clasica Femenina Navarra

2020
National Road Championships
4th Time Trial
5th Road Race

2021
1st  Overall Belgrade GP Woman Tour
1st Stage 1b
National Road Championships
4th Time Trial
7th Road Race

2022
National Road Championships
1st  Time Trial
5th Road Race
 1st  Overall Gracia Orlová
1st  Points classification
1st Stages 1, 3b & 4 
 1st  Overall Belgium Tour
1st Prologue
 1st  Overall Princess Anna Vasa Tour
1st  Points classification
1st Stages 1, 2 & 3
1st  Overall Giro Toscana Int. Femminile - Memorial Michela Fanini
1st  Points classification
1st Prologue
 1st Ladies Tour of Estonia
 3rd Visegrad 4 Ladies Series Hungary
 4th Visegrad 4 Ladies Series Slovakia
 5th Gran Premio della Liberazione
 6th Grand Prix du Morbihan Féminin

References

External links
 

1997 births
Living people
Polish female cyclists
Place of birth missing (living people)
21st-century Polish women